Mourão may refer to:

Mourão, a parish and a municipality of Alentejo Central, Portugal
Mourão (Vila Flor), a parish in the municipality of Vila Flor, Portugal 
David Mourão-Ferreira, a Portuguese writer
Hamilton Mourão, a Brazilian politician and retired Brazilian Army General